Disturbance is a studio album by English band Test Dept. It was released in March 2019 under One Little Indian Records.

It is the band's first album in 20 years.

Track listing

References

2019 albums
One Little Independent Records albums